The 1981 All-Ireland Senior Camogie Championship Final was the fiftieth All-Ireland Final and the deciding match of the 1981 All-Ireland Senior Camogie Championship, an inter-county camogie tournament for the top teams in Ireland.

A pitch intruder disputing with the referee meant that five minutes of stoppage time had to be played, which was enough for Kilkenny to close a six-point gap in the last eight minutes. In the replay, Cork lost Claire Cronin to injury and a late Angela Downey goal gave the Cats a flattering five-point win.

References

All-Ireland Senior Camogie Championship Finals
All-Ireland Senior Camogie Championship Final
All-Ireland Senior Camogie Championship Final
All-Ireland Senior Camogie Championship Final, 1981